Matthew David "Matt" Klein (born September 29, 1967) is an American politician and member of the Minnesota Senate. A member of the Minnesota Democratic–Farmer–Labor Party (DFL), he represents District 53 in the southeastern Twin Cities metropolitan area.

Early life, education, and career
Klein was raised in Saint Paul and graduated from Highland Park High School in 1985. He attended the University of Wisconsin–Madison, graduating with a Bachelor of Science, and went on to graduate as a Doctor of Medicine from Mayo Medical School. Klein was elected to the West St. Paul–Mendota Heights–Eagan School Board in 2012. He is a doctor of internal medicine at the Mayo Clinic in Rochester.

Minnesota Senate
Klein serves on the following committees in the Minnesota Senate:

 Chair, Commerce and Consumer Protection
Taxes
Energy

Personal life
Klein and his wife, Kristine, have five children and reside in Mendota Heights.

Electoral history

References

External links

 Official Senate website
 Official campaign website

Living people
Politicians from Saint Paul, Minnesota
People from Mendota Heights, Minnesota
University of Wisconsin–Madison alumni
Physicians from Minnesota
School board members in Minnesota
Democratic Party Minnesota state senators
21st-century American politicians
1967 births